Kristina Shadoba, aka Christina Shadoba (born January 1, 1987) is a Georgian women's football goalkeeper. She was part of Trabzonspor in the Turkish First League, before she played for Dinamo Tbilisi in her country. She was a member of the Georgia women's national U-19 and Georgia women's national teams.

career

Club
Between 2005 and 2008, Kristina Shadoba played for Dinamo Tbilisi in the  Georgia women's football championship. She obtained her Turkish license on February 8, 2008, for Trabzonspor. She played three years in the Turkish Women's First League from the 2008–09 season on. During this time, she capped in 40 matches, and scored also two goals.

She debuted in the 2007–08 UEFA Women's Cup – Group A7 (forerunner of the UEFA Women's Champions League) playing in two matches for the Georgian club Dinamo Tbilisi. After her later club Trabzonspor became the Turkish league champion at the end of the 2008–09 season on, she played in three matches of the 2009–10 UEFA Women's Champions League – Group D round.

International
At the 2011 FIFA Women's World Cup qualification – UEFA Group 3 round, she appeared once for Georgia.

She played in the UEFA Women's Euro 2013 qualifying round – Group 2 matches.

Career statistics

Honours 
 Georgia women's football championship
 FC Dinamo Tbilisi
 Winners (1): 2006–07

 Turkish Women's First League
 Trabzonspor
 Winners (1): 2008–09

References

External links

Living people
1987 births
Women's footballers from Georgia (country)
Women's association football goalkeepers
FC Dinamo Tbilisi players
Georgia (country) women's international footballers
Expatriate women's footballers from Georgia (country)
Expatriate women's footballers in Turkey
Trabzonspor women's players
Expatriate sportspeople from Georgia (country) in Turkey